Bilal Kamarieh (born 14 August 1996) is a German footballer of Lebanese descent who most recently played for Brandenburger SC Süd 05.

References

External links
 
 Bilal Kamarieh at FuPa

German footballers
Association football wingers
Hertha BSC II players
1. FSV Mainz 05 II players
Hertha Zehlendorf players
3. Liga players
Footballers from Berlin
1996 births
Living people
German people of Lebanese descent